OneAmerica Financial Partners, Inc. is a U.S. financial services mutual holding organization with corporate offices at the OneAmerica Tower in Indianapolis, Indiana.

The operating companies of OneAmerica Financial Partners, Inc. are American United Life Insurance Company, The State Life Insurance Company, OneAmerica Retirement Services LLC, McCready and Keene Inc., OneAmerica Securities, Inc., Pioneer Mutual Life Insurance Company, and AUL Reinsurance Management Services, LLC.

The operating companies offer individual life, disability, and long-term care insurance, and annuities. For businesses, they offer employee benefits, retirement plans, and group insurance. They operate throughout the United States except New York. OneAmerica Companies maintain "superior" financial ratings from A.M. Best and Standard and Poor's.

History 
Started as a life insurance group in 1877 by the Knights of Pythias, it became American Central Life Insurance Company in 1899.
In 1904 American Central Life Insurance Company established its Reinsurance Division, which as of 2015 is the oldest life reinsurance company in the U.S.
In  1930  Knights of Pythias separated the insurance program, creating United Mutual Life Insurance Company Inc.
The in 1936 American Central and United Mutual merge to form American United Life Insurance Company (AUL).

In 1957 American United Life Insurance Company started posting puns and funny sayings on a signboard in downtown Indianapolis.
In 1982 OneAmerica moved into OneAmerica Tower, the tallest building in Indianapolis at that time and in 1994 The State Life Insurance Company joined AUL and in 1998 Pioneer Mutual Life Insurance Company joined AUL/State Life.
In 2000  AUL reorganized to form American United Mutual Insurance Holding Company and OneAmerica Financial Partners, Inc.

In 2010 OneAmerica purchased McCready and Keene, Inc.
In 2014 OneAmerica purchased City National Bank's retirement services division.
In 2015  OneAmerica to purchased Bank of Montreal's BMO Retirement Services.

Company leadership

President of American Central Life Insurance Company
1899–1904 - Elijah Martindale
1904–1905 - Addison H. Nordyke
1905–1912 - Milton A. Woollen
1912–1936 - Herbert M. Woollen

President of United Mutual Life Insurance Company
1930–1933 - Harry Wade
1933–1936 - George Bangs

President of AUL/OneAmerica
1936–1940 - Herbert Woollen
1940–1947 - George Bangs
1948–1952 - Leslie E. Crouch
1952–1961 - Clarence A. Jackson
1962–1968 - Edward M. Karrmann
1968–1977 - Jack E. Reich
1977–1979 - F. Leslie Bartlet
1980–2004 - Jerry D. Semler
2004–2013 - Dayton H. Molendorp
2013–current - J. Scott Davison

CEO of AUL/OneAmerica
1968–1989 - Jack E. Reich
1989–2004 - Jerry D. Semler
2004–2014 - Dayton H. Molendorp
2014–current - J. Scott Davison

Chairman of the Board, AUL/OneAmerica
1936–1941 - Alva M. Lumpkin
1941–1947 - Leslie E. Crouch
1957–1967 - Clarence A. Jackson
1967–1991 - Jack E. Reich
1991–2007 - Jerry D. Semler
2007–2017 - Dayton H. Molendorp
2017–current - J. Scott Davison

Sponsorships 
OneAmerica has sponsored the 500 Festival's OneAmerica 500 Festival Mini-Marathon and 5K race since 2004. The current sponsorship deal runs through the 2019 race. The race is the largest mini-marathon in the U.S.

In 2015, OneAmerica signed a 4-year naming-rights partnership to become the title sponsor of Indianapolis Colts gameday radio broadcasts.

OneAmerica sponsored the mainstage at the Indiana Repertory Theatre for the 2017-2018 show season.

Miscellaneous
The OneAmerica Tower hosts Bop to the Top (originally called the AUL Stairclimb) each year since 1984. People climb 500 feet and 790 steps to raise money for charities.

OneAmerica is an investor in the downtown Indianapolis mall, Circle Centre.

See also
 Mutual fund

References

External links

Financial services companies established in 1877
Mutual insurance companies of the United States
Companies based in Indianapolis
1877 establishments in Indiana